Paranerita oroyana is a moth of the subfamily Arctiinae. It was described by Walter Rothschild in 1922. It is found in Peru.

References

Paranerita
Moths described in 1922